The Freethinker was a British secular humanist magazine, founded by G.W. Foote in 1881. One of the world's oldest surviving freethought publications, it moved online-only in 2014.

It has always taken an unapologetically atheist, anti-religious stance. In Issue 1 (May, 1881), Foote set out The Freethinker's purpose:

Although closely linked with the National Secular Society for most of its history (NSS Presidents and General Secretaries have at various times also served as Freethinker editor), The Freethinker is strictly autonomous and is not, and never has been, published by the NSS; it has been published by G. W. Foote & Co. Ltd. since its inception.

In 2006, the magazine's front-page masthead was changed from "Secular humanist monthly" to "The Voice of Atheism since 1881".

Barry Duke was the editor from 1998 until January 2022.  Emma Park succeeded him from January 2022.

History
Following the publication of anti-religious cartoons in the Christmas 1882 edition of The Freethinker, Foote was prosecuted for blasphemy, and sentenced to 12 months imprisonment with hard labour. On receiving his sentence from Mr Justice North (a devout Catholic), Foote said "with great deliberation" to the Judge "My Lord, I thank you; it is worthy of your creed". His description of this experience was published in 1886 as Prisoner for Blasphemy.

The April 2014 edition of The Freethinker contained an announcement that the May issue would be the last to appear in print; publication would continue online. The Freethinker kept its own website until all new content was moved to a section of the Patheos website, the first article appearing on 16 July 2021.

The Freethinker bulletin of 22 January 2022 announced that Barry Duke was moving to the newly established OnlySky website. His successor, Emma Park, was announced on The Freethinker website on 27 January 2022. In June 2022 Barry Duke explained that although The Freethinker was due to move from the Patheos website to OnlySky, the board of G. W. Foote & Co. Ltd. decided to keep its own dedicated website and to terminate his editorship.

List of Freethinker editors
 George William Foote, May 1881 – October 1915 (Edward Aveling edited the paper during Foote's imprisonment, 1883)
 Chapman Cohen, October 1915 – June 1951
 Frank Ridley, June 1951 – April 1954
 A Committee consisting of F. A. Hornibrook, Bayard Simmons, G. H. Taylor May 1954 – August 1959.
 Colin McCall replaced Simmons in 1957, his name appearing alongside Hornibrook and Taylor from December that year. He became sole editor from August 1959 until December 1965
 David Tribe, January 1966 – May 1966
 Kit Mouat, June 1966 – January 1967
 David Collis, January 1967 – October 1967
 Karl Hyde, November 1967 – August 1968
 David Reynolds, September 1968 – July 1970
 William McIlroy, August 1970 – December 1971
 Nigel Sinnott, January 1972 – September 1973
 Christopher Morey, October 1973 – December 1974
 William McIlroy, January 1975 – 1976
 Jim Herrick, January 1977 – 1981
 William McIlroy, September 1981 – December 1992
 Peter Brearey, January 1993 – 1998
 Barry Duke, 1998 – January 2022
 Dr Emma Park, January 2022 –

Citations

Bibliography

External links
 The Freethinker website
 Google Books (holds Vol. 10 [1890]).

Secularism in the United Kingdom
Secular humanism
Philosophy magazines
Freethought
Antireligion
Atheism publications
Atheism in the United Kingdom
Ethics literature
Irreligion
Magazines established in 1881
1881 establishments in the United Kingdom
Magazines disestablished in 2014
2014 disestablishments in the United Kingdom
Defunct magazines published in the United Kingdom
Monthly magazines published in the United Kingdom
Online magazines published in the United Kingdom
Online magazines with defunct print editions
Science and technology magazines published in the United Kingdom
Scientific skepticism mass media